The 13th Parliament of Catalonia, after 4 June 2021 known as the 14th Parliament of Catalonia, is the current meeting of the Parliament of Catalonia, with the membership determined by the results of the regional election held on 14 February 2021. The congress met for the first time on 12 March 2021. According to the Statute of Autonomy the maximum legislative term of the congress is 4 years from the preceding election. 

It is the thirteenth meeting of the Parliament of Catalonia since the falling of Franco's regime, however, during this session the numbering was changed in order to consider as the first meeting the one from the regional parliament established as a result of the 1932 Statue of Autonomy, whose duration was interrupted by the Spanish Civil War. Effectively, that meant that officially the 13th Parliament is skipped, as the decision didn't alter the numbering of the previous meetings.

Election 
The 14th Catalan regional election was held on 14 February 2021. At the election the Socialists' Party of Catalonia (PSC-PSOE) and Republican Left of Catalonia (ERC) became the largest party in the parliament with 33 seats each. In a close second place, Together for Catalonia (JxCat) won 32 seats. The parties supporting the independence of Catalonia won an overall majority, and for the first time, they got over 50% of the votes (if included those without representation).

History 
The new parliament met for the first time on 12 March 2021 and after two rounds, Laura Borràs (JxCat) was elected as President of the Parliament of Catalonia with the support of ERC.

Members

Notes

References

External links 
 Official website of the Parliament of Catalonia (in Catalan)
 Members of the 14th Parliament (in Catalan)
 List of candidates for the 14th Parliament in the 2021 regional elections in Barcelona, Girona, Lleida and Tarragona (in Spanish)

Parliament of Catalonia
 
2021 establishments in Spain